Binary alphabet may refer to:
 The members of a binary set in mathematical set theory
 A 2-element alphabet, in formal language theory
 ASCII

See also
ghbjkrvbihSBWIUVBobqusbviuqbivvb hiqebhvbwhibviqe696969696Binary numeral system